The Ripley Formation is a geological formation in North America found in the U.S. states of Alabama, Georgia, Mississippi, Missouri, and Tennessee. The lithology is consistent throughout the layer.  It consists mainly of glauconitic sandstone.  It was formed by sediments deposited during the Maastrichtian stage of the Late Cretaceous.  It is a unit of the Selma Group and consists of the Cusseta Sand Member, McNairy Sand Member and an unnamed lower member.  It has not been extensively studied by vertebrate paleontologists, due to a lack of accessible exposures. However, fossils have been unearthed including crocodile, hadrosaur, nodosaur, tyrannosaur, ornithomimid, dromaeosaur, and mosasaur remains have been recovered from the Ripley Formation.

Paleofauna
Hypsibema missouriensis (hadrosaurid) – "Caudal vertebrae, fragmentary dentary and predentary."
cf. Gryposaurus sp.
 Nodosauridae sp.
 Tyrannosauroidea sp.
cf. Albertosaurus sp.
 Dromaeosauridae sp.
Possible Ornithomimidae indet.
Eothoracosaurus mississippiensis
Thoracosaurus neocesariensis
Leidyosuchus sp.
 Adocus punctatus
 Naomichelys speciosa
 Trionyx sp.
 Habrosaurus sp.
 Amiidae sp.
 Lepisosteus sp.
 Platacodon nanus

See also

List of dinosaur-bearing rock formations
List of fossil sites

References

Cretaceous Mississippi
Cretaceous Alabama
Cretaceous Georgia (U.S. state)
Cretaceous Missouri
Cretaceous geology of Tennessee
Sandstone in the United Kingdom
Chalk
Maastrichtian Stage of North America